The list of shipwrecks in February 1886 includes ships sunk, foundered, grounded, or otherwise lost during February 1886.

1 February

3 February

5 February

7 February

8 February

9 February

10 February

11 February

12 February

13 February

15 February

16 February

17 February

22 February

25 February

26 February

27 February

28 February

Unknown date

References

1886-02
Maritime incidents in February 1886